is a railway station in the city of Okazaki, Aichi, Japan, operated by Meitetsu.

Lines
Okazakikōen-mae Station is served by the Meitetsu Nagoya Main Line and is 31.1 kilometers from the terminus of the line at Toyohashi Station.

Station layout
The station has two opposed side platforms connected by an underground passage. The station has automated ticket machines, Manaca automated turnstiles and is staffed.

Platforms

Adjacent stations

Station history
The Aichi Electric Railway was acquired by the Meitetsu Group on 1 August 1935. The station was renamed to its present name in 1936. The station has been unattended since February 1971.

Passenger statistics
In fiscal 2017, the station was used by an average of 4,422 passengers daily.

Surrounding area
 Hatcho-miso no sato
 Japan National Route 1

See also
 List of Railway Stations in Japan

References

External links

 Official web page 

Railway stations in Japan opened in 1923
Railway stations in Aichi Prefecture
Stations of Nagoya Railroad
Okazaki, Aichi